A tone indicator or tone tag is a symbol attached to a sentence or message sent in a textual form, such as over the internet, to explicitly state the intonation or intent of the message, especially when it may be otherwise ambiguous.

History 
Early attempts to create tone indicators stemmed from the difficulty of denoting irony in print media, and so several irony punctuation marks were proposed. The percontation point (⸮; a reversed question mark) was proposed by Henry Denham in the 1580s to denote a rhetorical question, but usage died out by the 1700s.
In 1668, John Wilkins proposed the irony mark, using an inverted exclamation mark (¡) to denote an ironic statement. Various other punctuation marks were proposed over the following centuries to denote irony, but none gained popular usage. More recently, in 1982, the emoticon was created to be used to denote jokes (with :-)) or things that are not jokes (with :-().

The syntax of modern tone indicators stems from /s, which has long been used on the internet to denote sarcasm. This symbol is an abbreviated version of the earlier /sarcasm, itself a simplification of </sarcasm>, the form of a humorous HTML closing tag marking the end of a "sarcasm" block, and therefore placed at the end of a sarcastic passage.

Internet usage 
On the internet, one or more tone indicators may be placed at the end of a message. A tone indicator on the internet typically takes the form of a forward slash ("/") followed by an abbreviation of a relevant adjective. For example, "/srs" may be attached to the end of a message to indicate that the message is meant to be interpreted in a serious manner, as opposed to, for example, being a joke (which is commonly represented as "/j"). Tone indicators are used to explicitly state the intent of the author, instead of leaving the message up to interpretation.

See also 
 Internet slang
 Poe's law

References 

Internet terminology